Into the Quiet is an album by Kristy Hanson released in 2010.

Track listing

Personnel
Mike Chiaburu - electric bass
Ryan Freeland - recording engineer, mixing,
Kristy Hanson - vocals, acoustic guitar
Gavin Lurssen - mastering engineer

References

2010 albums